Cuba–Russia relations reflect the political, economic and cultural exchanges between Cuba and Russia. These countries have had close cooperation since the days of the Soviet Union. Russia has an embassy in Havana and a consulate-general in Santiago de Cuba. Cuba has an embassy in Moscow and an honorary consulate in Saint Petersburg. Around 55,000 people of Russian descent live in Cuba.

A 2016 survey shows that 67% of Cubans have a favorable view of Russia, with 8% expressing an unfavorable view.

Cuba and the Soviet Union

Diplomatic ties between the Soviet Union and Cuba were established after the 1959 Cuban Revolution. Cuba became dependent on Soviet markets and military aid and was a major ally of the Soviet Union during the Cold War. In 1972, Cuba joined the COMECON, an economic organization of communist countries that was dominated by the Soviet Union, which had the largest economy.

Cuba and the Russian Federation

Since the fall of the Soviet Union in 1991, Cuba and Russia have maintained their diplomatic relations. After Vladimir Putin came to power in 2000, relations between both countries increased. In December 2000, Putin visited Cuba and he along with Fidel Castro called for the lifting of the embargo on Cuba. Russia is still Cuba's leading creditor and the two countries maintain close economic ties with each other. Cuba strongly supported Russia's position in the 2008 South Ossetian war. In the fall of 2008 Cuba and Russia increased joint cooperation with each other in the field of economics. Russian deputy Prime Minister Igor Sechin visited Cuba several times in 2008 in order to increase economic and political ties. Russia was the first country to provide aid to Cuba after three hurricanes devastated the country in the fall of 2008. The assistance provided by Russia included four planes of food, medical supplies and construction supplies.

In November 2008, Russian President Dmitry Medvedev visited Cuba to strengthen economic ties and to allow Russian companies to drill for oil offshore in Cuban waters, and to allow Russian mining companies to mine nickel in Cuba. Raul Castro traveled for a week-long visit to Moscow from January 28, 2009, to February 4, 2009. The talks included $20 million worth of credit to Havana, and 25,000 tons of grain as humanitarian aid to Cuba.

In July 2009 Russia began oil exploration in the Gulf of Mexico after signing a deal with Cuba. Under the new agreement, Russia has also granted a loan of $150m to buy construction and agricultural equipment. In 2013, Medvedev again visited Cuba in which he signed agreements on education, health, hydrometeorology, aeronautics and space technology.

After Russia annexed Crimea from Ukraine in March 2014, Cuba recognized Crimea as a part of Russia.

In July 2014, Vladimir Putin also visited Cuba, where he touted a decision to wipe clean 90 percent of the island's $35 billion debt to Moscow and announced deals to invest in Cuba's offshore oil industry.

In February 2022, Russia launched an invasion of Ukraine. The invasion received widespread international condemnation. Cuba abstained from voting on a United Nations resolution condemning Russia's actions. During a visit in Russia, Cuban president Miguel Díaz-Canel blamed the United States for the war and condemned the sanctions Western nations imposed on Russia.

See also

 Foreign relations of Cuba
 Foreign relations of Russia

References

External links

Cuban embassy in Moscow
Russian embassy in Havana
Cuba, Russia Enhance Cooperation 
[rtsp://webcast.un.org/ondemand/conferences/unhrc/upr/4th/hrc090205pm1-eng.rm?start=00:31:08&end=00:33:09 Russian delegate Valery Loshchinin praises Cuba's human rights record] during the review of Cuba by the United Nations Human Rights Council's Universal Periodic Review, February 5, 2009
http://edition.cnn.com/2000/WORLD/americas/12/15/cuba.putin.02/index.html CNN 
Official Statement from the Government of Cuba
Official Statement from the Government of Cuba

 
Russia
Bilateral relations of Russia